Guru's Jazzmatazz: Streetsoul is the third solo studio album by American hip hop musician Guru. It was released on October 3, 2000 via Virgin Records as the third installment of Guru's Jazzmatazz album series. Production was handled by Gang Starr, The Neptunes, Agallah, DJ Scratch, Erykah Badu, J Dilla, The Roots and Victor Flowers.

Synopsis 
As the title seems to suggest, this volume featured a blend of soul with R&B. The decline in jazz inflections that made Jazzmatazz, Vol. 1 popular continued on this release (the decline was already noticeable on Jazzmatazz, Vol. 2: The New Reality). According to Billboard's music charts, any aspersions levied by music critics against the album had little (if any) impact on its performance in the marketplace. Streetsoul outperformed previous entries significantly; it peaked at #32 and #8 on the Billboard 200 and Top R&B/Hip-Hop Albums charts respectively.

As with previous releases, a host of guest performers were featured on this recording. Most of the artists are stalwarts of the neo soul and R&B scene. First-time appearances in the series were made by several contemporary acts, including Amel Larrieux, Angie Stone, Bilal, Craig David, Donell Jones, Erykah Badu, and The Roots. Veterans featured on this release include Herbie Hancock and Isaac Hayes.

Track listing

Sample credits
Track 3 contains a sample of "Here I Am" as performed by the Blue Notes and "It's Not a Game" performed by American Cream Team
Track 8 contains a sample of "Keep Your Head to the Sky" as performed by Earth, Wind & Fire
Track 13 contains a sample of "Walk From Regios" performed by Isaac Hayes
Track 14 contains a sample of "Love Without Sex" performed by Gwen McCrae

Personnel 
 ?uestlove — drummer, producer
 Erykah Badu — vocals, producer
 Kevin Bergen — engineer, mixing assistant
 Big Shug — performer
 Black Thought — vocals
 Drew Coleman — engineer
 DJ Premier — producer
 Tom Coyne — mastering
 Craig David — vocals
 Ryan Dorn — keyboards, vocals
 Todd Fairall — engineer
 Tameka Foster — stylist
 Macy Gray — vocals
 Guru — vocals
 Herbie Hancock — performer
 Isaac Hayes — vocals
 Donell Jones — vocals
 Caleb Lambert — engineer
 Amel Larrieux — performer
 Amy Linden — liner notes
 Shaun Martin — keyboards
 Bill McMullen — art direction, design
 Mark Mitchell — engineer
 Les Nubians — performer
 James Poyser — producer
 Junior Reid — vocals
 Eddie Sancho — engineer, mixing
 Jon Smeltz — engineer, mixing
 Ryan Smith — engineer
 Tom Soares — mixing
 Angie Stone — vocals
 Dexter Thibou — engineer, mixing, mixing assistant
 Pharrell Williams — producer, multi instruments
 Chad Hugo — producer, multi instruments
 J Dilla — producer
 Patrick Moxey — executive producer
 Aaron Seawood — executive producer

Charts

References

External links

2000 albums
Sequel albums
EMI Records albums
Guru (rapper) albums
Virgin Records albums
Albums produced by Guru
Albums produced by Agallah
Albums produced by J Dilla
Albums produced by Questlove
Albums produced by DJ Premier
Albums produced by DJ Scratch
Albums produced by the Neptunes